Samuel Jereton Mariere  (1907 – 9 May 1971) was the first governor of the former Midwest State of Nigeria from February 1964 to January 1966.  He was also the first chancellor of the University of Lagos, Akoka, Lagos and the first president of the Christian Council of Nigeria.

In 1935 Mariere was elected secretary-general of the Urhobo Progressive Union, an association created in 1931 to articulate and chart a direction for the Urhobo people. He was subsequently created a traditional chieftain by them, becoming the Olorogun of Evwreni in 1953.
He was elected a member of the Nigerian House of Representatives for the Urhobo East and later Central district.
Mariere was a leader of the agitation for creation of a new region out of the old Western Region, which was dominated by the Yoruba. The Mid-Western Region was created in 1963 after a plebiscite in which all the Urhobo divisions voted unanimously in favor, and Mariere was later appointed the first governor. Following this he was given two other aristocratic titles, that of the Onisogene of Aboh in 1964 and that of the Ogifueze of Agbor in 1965.

Mariere died in a vehicle accident in 1971.
A student residential hall is named after him in the University of Lagos, with a life-size statue at the entrance.

References

1971 deaths
1907 births
Governors of Delta State
Urhobo people
Members of the House of Representatives (Nigeria)
State governors of Nigeria
Academic staff of the University of Lagos
Delta State politicians
20th-century Nigerian politicians
Nigerian Christians